Hance James Logan,  (April 26, 1869 – December 26, 1944) was a Canadian lawyer and politician.

Born in Amherst Point, Nova Scotia, the son of James Archibald Logan, he was educated at the Model School of Truro, the Pictou Academy and Dalhousie University where he graduated with a Bachelor of Laws (LL.B.) in 1891. He was called to the Nova Scotia bar in 1892 and practised law in Amherst. In 1909, he was named King's Counsel.

Logan was first elected to the House of Commons of Canada for the electoral district of Cumberland on June 23, 1896, by a majority of 155 votes, defeating Arthur Rupert Dickey, the Minister of Justice in the Charles Tupper Government. A Liberal, he was re-elected in 1900 and 1904. He was defeated in 1911 and 1917. He was re-elected in 1921 and was defeated in 1925. In 1929, he was summoned to the Senate of Canada representing the senatorial division of Cumberland, Nova Scotia on the advice of William Lyon Mackenzie King. He served until his death in 1944.

He was married twice: to Eleanor L. Kinder in 1891 and then to Anna Blanche MacKenna in 1921.

Electoral record

References

1869 births
1944 deaths
Canadian senators from Nova Scotia
Schulich School of Law alumni
Liberal Party of Canada MPs
Liberal Party of Canada senators
Members of the House of Commons of Canada from Nova Scotia
Canadian King's Counsel